This page summarizes projects that brought more than  of new liquid fuel capacity to market with the first production of fuel beginning in 2007.  This is part of the Wikipedia summary of Oil Megaprojects.

Quick links to other years

Detailed project table for 2007 

Terminology
 Year Startup: year of first oil. put specific date if available.
 Operator: company undertaking the project.
 Area: onshore (LAND), offshore (OFF), offshore deep water (ODW), tar sands (TAR).
 Type: liquid category (i.e. Natural Gas Liquids, Natural gas condensate, Crude oil)
 Grade: oil quality (light, medium, heavy, sour) or API gravity
 2P resvs: 2P (proven + probable) oil reserves in giga barrels (Gb).
 GOR: The ratio of produced gas to produced oil, commonly abbreviated GOR.
 Peak year: year of the production plateau/peak.
 Peak: maximum production expected (thousand barrels/day).
 Discovery: year of discovery.
 Capital investment: expected capital cost; FID (Final Investment Decision) - If no FID, then normally no project development contracts can be awarded.  For many projects, a FEED stage (Front End Engineering Design) precedes the FID.
 Notes: comments about the project (footnotes).
 Ref: list of sources.

References 

2007
Oil fields
Proposed energy projects
Projects established in 2007
2007 in the environment
2007 in technology